Fokserød is a residential- and statistical area (grunnkrets) in Sandefjord municipality, Norway. Fokserød was originally the name of three former farms located near the current Coop Obs! megastore, relatively near Sandefjord Airport Torp. Former written forms were Foxarôyru (1346), Faxerrudt (1575), Fuxáeröd (1625), and Foxeröed (1664). It is home of Fokserød Nature Preserve, a preserved birch tree forest located by the main entry road from E18 to Torp Airport. In the 1960s, it was one of the first places in Norway where nesting Hawfinch were recorded. The nature preserve was established on June 13, 1980, and it occupies 38 decares (9.4 acres). The nature preserve is divided in two by the road Torpveien that leads to Torp Airport and Kullerød.

The statistical area Fokserød, which also can include the peripheral parts of the village as well as the surrounding countryside, has a population of 822.

Fokserød is located between Haukerød borough in the south and Fevang in the north. It is considered a part of the urban settlement Sandefjord, which covers the greater Sandefjord city area and stretches towards Stokke and into peripheral parts of Larvik municipality. The urban settlement Sandefjord has a population of 39,849, of which 39,144 people live within Sandefjord.

References

Villages in Vestfold og Telemark
Nature reserves in Norway